= Isabelle Gibassier =

French footballer (born 1960)

Personal information
- Date of birth: 21 October 1960 (age 66)
- Place of birth: Caen, France
- Position: Defender

Senior career*
Years	Team	Apps	(Gls)
1985–1989	FC Lisieux		

International career
1982–1983	France	3	(0)
- * Club domestic league appearances and goals

Isabelle Gibassier is a retired French professional footballer who played as a defender for French club FC Lisieux and the France national team.

== International career ==
Gibassier represented France 3 times and scored 0 goals.
